The 16th Biathlon World Championships were held in 1978 in Hochfilzen, Austria.

Men's results

20 km individual

10 km sprint

4 × 7.5 km relay

Medal table

References

1978
Biathlon World Championships
International sports competitions hosted by Austria
1978 in Austrian sport
Sport in Tyrol (state)
March 1978 sports events in Europe
Biathlon competitions in Austria